Albert Joseph Onofrio (March 15, 1921 – November 5, 2004) was an American football player and coach.  He served as the head football coach at the University of Missouri from 1971 to 1977, compiling a record of 38–41. He spent 13 years, from 1958 to 1970, as an assistant coach at Missouri under Dan Devine.  His Missouri football teams upset the Notre Dame Fighting Irish on October 21, 1972, at South Bend, Indiana, the Alabama Crimson Tide on September 8, 1975, at Birmingham, the USC Trojans at Los Angeles on September 11, 1976, the Ohio State Buckeyes at Columbus two weeks later, and the Arizona State Sun Devils at Tempe on October 1, 1977, during his final season at Missouri.  In his seven years at Mizzou, Onofrio compiled a 1–6 record against arch-rival Kansas, which contributed to his dismissal.

Onofrio coached four All-Americans and 30 future National Football League players. He led Missouri to two bowl games, the 1972 Fiesta Bowl, a loss to Arizona State, and the 1973 Sun Bowl, a win over Auburn.

Onofrio was a 1993 inductee to the Missouri Intercollegiate Athletic Hall of Fame.  He died on November 5, 2004, in Tempe, Arizona.

Head coaching record

Early life and education
Onofrio received a bachelor and masters degree from Arizona State University where he was the president of the student body and named all conference halfback in football. Onofrio served in the Navy from 1943–46 during World war II. He was a gunnery and executive officer on the LCTR-464 and participated in the bombardment of Omaha Beach on D-Day during the invasion of Normandy.

References

External links
 

1921 births
2004 deaths
American football halfbacks
Arizona State Sun Devils football players
Arizona State Sun Devils football coaches
Missouri Tigers football coaches
United States Navy personnel of World War II
United States Navy officers
People from Culver City, California
Sportspeople from Los Angeles County, California
Players of American football from California
Military personnel from California